Tongcheng is the governmental seat and the name of a county in Xianning City, Hubei, People's Republic of China, bordering the provinces of Jiangxi (to the east) and Hunan (to the south and west).

History 

The Red 16th Army, stationed at the Hunan-Hubei-Jiangxi Soviet annihilated an entire regiment of the Guomindang/Nationalist army here in December 1930, disrupting its planned siege of the Red base.

Administration 
Nine towns:
Junshui, Maishi, Tanghu, Guandao, Shadui, Wuli, Shinan, Beigang, Magang

Two townships:
Sizhuang Township, Daping Township

Climate

References

 
Counties of Hubei
Xianning